The Women's individual compound event at the 2010 South American Games was held on March 22, beginning at 9:30 and ending at 12:10, with the main final.

Medalists

Results

Finals

Top Half

Bottom Half

References
Report

Individual Compound Women